Fantoma Films is a San Francisco, California based film distributor specializing in "eclectic" cult films and ephemeral films such as educational short films. Fantoma has re-released works by Fritz Lang, Wim Wenders, Kenneth Anger, Sergio Corbucci, Yasuzo Masumura, and others.

References

Companies based in San Francisco
DVD companies of the United States